The 2017–18 Northern Iowa Panthers women's basketball team represents the University of Northern Iowa in the 2017–18 NCAA Division I women's basketball season. The Panthers, led by eleventh year head coach Tanya Warren, play their home games at McLeod Center and are members of the Missouri Valley Conference. They finished the season 19–14, 13–5 in MVC play to finish in third place. They advanced to the championship game of the Missouri Valley Tournament where they lost to Drake. They received an at-large bid to the Women's National Invitation Tournament where they lost to Milwaukee in the first round.

Previous season
They advanced to the championship game of the Missouri Valley Tournament where they lost to Drake. They received an at-large to the NCAA women's tournament for the first time since 2011 where they lost to DePaul in the first round.

Roster

Schedule

|-
!colspan=9 style=| Exhibition

|-
!colspan=9 style=| Non-conference regular season

|-
!colspan=9 style=| Missouri Valley Conference Regular season

|-
!colspan=9 style=| Missouri Valley Women's Tournament

|-
!colspan=9 style=| WNIT

See also
2017–18 Northern Iowa Panthers men's basketball team

References

Northern Iowa Panthers women's basketball seasons
Northern Iowa
Northern Iowa
Panth
Panth